Alice Pestana or Maria Evelina Pestana Coelho (7 April 1860 – 24 December 1929) was a prolific Portuguese writer. She was the first president of the pacifist organisation Portuguese League for Peace that was founded in 1899.

Life
Pestana was born in the city of Santarém in central Portugal on 7 April 1860. Her parents were Eduardo Augusto Villar Coelho
and Matilde Soares Pestana. She was educated well and she studied languages at the National High School of Lisbon where she was taught by women teachers. She learnt about natural history, chemistry and physics and read classic and modern literature. She studied French, Portuguese and English and her first published writing was in English.

She founded the Portuguese League for Peace on 18 May 1899 and she was the first president of the pacifist organisation. The organisation was formed as a daughter organisation of the Altruism Society which she was a member. That society's motto was "Truth, Justice and Righteousness". She wrote short stories, novels and plays.

She was one of the first women in Portugal who were concerned with women's subordinate status and in particular about improving the educational opportunities for Women in Portugal together with Francisca Wood, Maria Carvalho, Carolina Michaëlis de Vasconcelos, Alice Moderno, Angelina Vidal, Antónia Pusich and Guiomar Torrezão.

She wrote for the Lisbon newspaper, . She married a Spaniard and moved to Spain in 1901. She translated Spanish works into Portuguese and published her own novel Desgarrada in 1902.

Pestana died on Christmas Eve 1929 in Madrid. She is buried in the Civil Cemetery in Madrid.

Private life
She married a teacher, Pedro Blanco Suárez, in Lisbon in 1901.

Works
 O Que Deve Ser a Ecucação Secundária da Mulher? (1892)
 Desgarrada (1902).

References

1860 births
1929 deaths
People from Santarém, Portugal
Portuguese women novelists
Portuguese women short story writers
Pacifists
19th-century Portuguese dramatists and playwrights
19th-century Portuguese novelists
19th-century Portuguese women writers
19th-century pseudonymous writers
 Pseudonymous women writers
Portuguese women dramatists and playwrights